Cladarctia is a monotypic tiger moth genus in the family Erebidae erected by Nobutoyo Kôda in 1988. Its only species, Cladarctia quadriramosa, was first described by Vincenz Kollar in 1844. It is found in Tibet, Nepal, Kashmir and the north-western Himalayas.

References

 Kollar, V. (1844). Aufzählung und Beschreibung der von Freiherrn Carl v. Hügel auf seiner Reise durch Kaschmir und das Himaleyagebirge gesammelten Insecten. In: Hügel, C. F. von, Kaschmir und das Reich der Siek. Vol. 4, Band 2 pp. 395–564, 28 plates. Hallbergerische Verlagshandlung: Stuttgart. 

Spilosomina
Moths described in 1844
Monotypic moth genera
Moths of Asia